The Sikh Reference Library was a repository of an estimated 20,000 literary works located in the Harmandir Sahib (Golden Temple) at Amritsar, Punjab which was destroyed during Operation Blue Star. In 1984, the library's contents were confiscated by the Central Bureau of Investigation (CBI) and the empty building allegedly burned to the ground by the Indian Army on 7 June. In recent years the Shiromani Gurdwara Parbandhak Committee (SGPC) has attempted to recover the looted material but has not yet recovered substantial materials. To date, the status of library manuscripts and artifacts is unclear; the vast majority remain in the hands of the government, a few office files and passports were returned, and as many as 117 items were destroyed for being "seditious" materials. After the events of Operation Blue Star, the library was revived and its current collection has surpassed the total contents of the original library.

Origin
The Sikh Reference Library was established by the SGPC with a resolution dated 27 October 1946. The library had its roots in a meeting of the Sikh Historical Society under the presidency of Princess Bamba on 10 February 1945 at Khalsa College, Amritsar which established the Central Sikh library. The Central Sikh library was then folded into the Sikh Reference Library.

Historical materials
Prior to its destruction by Indian troops, the library hosted a vast collection of an estimated 20,000 literary works, including 11,107 books (another estimate puts the number of books having been 12,613), 2,500 manuscripts, 20–25 handwritten edicts (hukamnama) signed and issued by the Sikh Gurus, newspaper archives, historical letters, documents/files. It also contained handwritten manuscripts (bir) of the Guru Granth Sahib, the primary and central Sikh scripture. The library also held documents related to the Indian Independence Movement. Most of the literature was written in the Punjabi-language and related to Sikhism, but there were also Hindi, Assamese, Bengali, Sindhi, Persian, Arabic, Tibetan, English, and French works touching upon various topics.

Destruction
According to the Indian Army white paper on Operation Blue Star, the library was destroyed on the night of 5 June 1984 in the midst of a firefight. However, according to V. M. Tarkunde, the library was still intact on 6 June when the Army had gained control of the Golden Temple, and was in fact burned down by the army at some point between 6 June and 14 June. Although the Indian Army has maintained that the library's contents were completely destroyed on 5 June, the SGPC has contradicted their version of events. By using witness accounts, the SGPC has alleged that material from the library was taken in gunny sacks on military truck to Amritsar's Youth Club, a temporary office of the CBI, and the empty library was burned by the army afterwards. At that location, the CBI catalogued the materials until September 1984, when in light of a Sikh convention being held in the city, the library's contents were moved to an undisclosed location.

Coverup
In 2003, Ranjit Nanda, a former inspector for the Central Bureau of Investigation, (CBI) turned whistleblower and revealed he was part of a five-member team which scrutinized the documents at the CBI's makeshift office at Amritsar's Youth Club.  He revealed that officials from his department were "desperately looking for a purported letter written by Indira Gandhi, the then Prime Minister, to Jarnail Singh Bhindranwale", and reported seeing letters from the other leaders addressed to Sant Jarnail Singh Ji Khalsa Bhindranwale. Manjit Calcutta, a former secretary of the SGPC, corroborated Nanda's version of events but further alleged that the army set the library "on fire in desperation when it failed to find the letter". Nanda further confirmed the SGPC's version of events by describing how after inspecting each book and manuscript the CBI packed the documents into 165 numbered gunny sacks and bundled the material into waiting army vehicles because of a meeting of Sikh high priests taking place at the time. He also showed a letter from his superiors commending his work "during examination of documents from SGPC ".

Efforts to recover the material

Since 1988, the SGPC has written to the Central Government asking for the return of the material taken by the CBI but has only received minor office files.

On 23 May 2000 George Fernandes wrote to the SGPC Secretary, Gurbachan Singh Bachan, and acknowledged that the Indian Army had taken the books and other documents from the Sikh Reference Library and handed them over to the CBI.  He asked him to refer the matter to the Ministry of Personnel, Public Grievances and Pensions, whose jurisdiction the CBI falls under.

In a visit to Jalandhar, Punjab  Fernandes announced that the CBI had destroyed 117 "seditious" documents from the material taken from the Sikh Reference Library.

On 25 March 2003, A. P. J. Abdul Kalam made assurances that the books, documents, and manuscripts would be returned; however, he took no further action.

On 26 April 2004, the Punjab and Haryana High Court ordered the Central Government, Government of Punjab, and the CBI to return the "valuables, books, scriptures, paintings, etc, that were seized from the Golden Temple during “Operation Bluestar” in 1984".

In February and May 2009, A. K. Antony, defense minister of India, claimed in parliament that the Indian Army no longer had any material taken from the library. Various members of parliament and the SGPC criticized him for "misleading parliament".

Revival 
The library was restored after the original and its collection was destroyed in Operation Blue Star. Its collection has been refilled due to community, institutional, and individual-based donations of literary works. The revived library continues in operation to the present. It has amassed a collection of 24,540 books according to a 2017 estimate. Estimates for individual types of other literary works is 550 Guru Granth Sahib manuscripts, 75 Dasam Granth manuscripts, and 1,300 general manuscripts. No issued edicts (hukamnama) signed by the Sikh Gurus have been recollected in the revived library. Digitization work is being conducted to save the collection for posterity and to prevent a similar loss of its contents again. A special fumegation treatment chamber has been installed to preserve the works from insect and environmental damage.

A new building is being construction at Bhai Gurdas Hall to rehouse the library in, as the current building in the Golden Temple complex is deemed too small to meet the needs of the growing collection. This has been opposed by some on the grounds that the original location is a witness to history of the events of Operation Blue Star and serves as a reminder for devotees of that episode.

References

Amritsar
Sikh places
History of Sikhism
Defunct libraries
Libraries established in 1946
Libraries disestablished in 1984
Libraries in India
1946 establishments in India
1984 disestablishments in India
Sikhism in Punjab, India